Berghult is a Swedish surname that may refer to the following notable people:
Carl Rudolf Berghult (1905–2000) was the mayor of Duluth, Minnesota, U.S.
Joel Berghult (born 1988), Swedish singer, songwriter, producer, YouTuber and comedian
Patricia Berghult (born 1994), Swedish professional boxer

Swedish-language surnames